Atheniella is an agaric fungal genus that produces mostly brightly colored (yellow, pink, orange, or red) mycenoid fruit bodies on small plant debris on forest floors, in fields and bogs. It is not a member of the Mycenaceae, and unlike most Mycenaceae, its basidiospores and tissues do not react with iodine. Atheniella species were most recently classified in Mycena because of their stature. However, they lack amyloid spores and tissues bewildering taxonomists, leading to temporary placements in Hemimycena and Marasmiellus before being phylogenetically excluded from both genera and the Mycenaceae. Most recently the genus has been classified in the Porotheleaceae. Currently 12 species are recognized.

Etymology

The name Atheniella is an allusion to Athena because of the combination of beautiful coloration armed with the shield or spear-like stature of the mycenoid fruit bodies and also a play on the etymological link between Mycenaean culture and the ancient origins of the generic name Mycena, and of Athena alluding to the older classification of Atheniella species in the genus Mycena.

References

Porotheleaceae
Agaricales genera